
Year 293 BC was a year of the pre-Julian Roman calendar. At the time it was known as the Year of the Consulship of Cursor and Maximus (or, less frequently, year 461 Ab urbe condita). The denomination 293 BC for this year has been used since the early medieval period, when the Anno Domini calendar era became the prevalent method in Europe for naming years.

Events 
 By place 
 Roman Republic 
 Third Samnite War:
 Lucius Postumius Megellus, a consul of the previous year, avoids prosecution after he is appointed legate to consul Spurius Carvilius Maximus.
 The consul Carvilius captures the city of Amiternum, and consul Lucius Papirius Cursor captures the city of Duronia.
 On the same day that Carvilius storms the major Samnite city of Cominium, Papirius, aided by former consuls Lucius Volumnius Flamma Violens and Lucius Cornelius Scipio Barbatus, defeats the 'Linen Legion' in the Battle of Aquilonia and captures the city of Aquilonia during the Samnite retreat. The Samnites suffer 20,340 killed and 3870 captured in the Battle of Aquilonia and 4880 killed and 11,400 captured in the Siege of Cominium.
 Carvilius captures the towns of Velia, Palumbinum, and, after an initial defeat, Herculaneum, and after heavy fighting, Papirius captures the city of Saepinum.
 Due to renewed hostility among some of the Etruscans, who are joined by the Falisci, Carvilius marches to Etruria, storms the town of Troilum and captures five forts. The Falisci then sue for peace and receive a one-year truce.
 The worship of Aesculapius is introduced from Epidaurus to Rome in the hope of ending a plague.

 Persia 
 When an invasion of nomads threatens the eastern possessions of his realm (i.e. between the Caspian Sea and the Aral Sea and the Indian Ocean), Seleucus hands over the government of these lands west of the Euphrates to his son Antiochus. Antiochus is appointed co-regent and commander-in-chief of these territories.

 China 
 The State of Qin, led by commander Bai Qi, wins a decisive victory over the States of Wei and Han in the Battle of Yique. He then captures territories in Han before invading and capturing further territories in Wei.

Births

Deaths

References